Whitlam is a surname. Notable people with the surname include:

 Fred Whitlam (1884–1961), Australia's Crown Solicitor from 1936 to 1949, pioneer of international human rights law in Australia; father of Gough Whitlam
Freda Whitlam (1920-2018), Australian educator and religious leader
 Gough Whitlam (1916–2014), 21st Prime Minister of Australia
 Margaret Whitlam (1919–2012), wife of Gough Whitlam, author, social worker and champion swimmer
 Nicholas Whitlam (1945–), Australian businessman; son of Gough and Margaret Whitlam
 Olivia Whitlam (1985–), English rower
 Tony Whitlam (1944–), Australian lawyer, politician and judge; son of Gough and Margaret Whitlam